The 2019 season was Yorkshire Diamonds' fourth and final season, in which they competed in the Women's Cricket Super League, a Twenty20 competition. The side finished fourth in the group stage, winning five of their ten matches.

The side was captained by Lauren Winfield and coached by Danielle Hazell. They played two home matches apiece at Headingley Cricket Ground and Clifton Park, and one at the North Marine Road Ground. Following the season, women's domestic cricket in England was reformed, with the creation of new "regional hubs", with Yorkshire Diamonds replaced by Northern Diamonds, which retained some elements of the original team but represent a larger area.

Squad
Yorkshire Diamonds confirmed their squad on 6 August 2019. Age given is at the start of Yorkshire Diamonds' first match of the season (6 August 2019).

Women's Cricket Super League

Season standings

 Advanced to the Final.
 Advanced to the Semi-final.

League stage

Statistics

Batting

Bowling

Fielding

Wicket-keeping

References

Yorkshire Diamonds seasons
2019 in English women's cricket